The Ukrainian National Bloc of Kostenko and Plyushch, is a defunct political alliance in Ukraine led by Yuriy Kostenko and Ivan Plyushch.
It consisted out of:
Party of Free Peasants and Entrepreneurs of Ukraine
Political Party Cathedral Ukraine
Ukrainian People's Party

At the 2006 Ukrainian parliamentary election, 26 March 2006, it won 1,87% of the popular vote and no seats in the Ukrainian Parliament, although it did win seats in some Ukrainian provinces regional council elections.

After the 2006 elections the party's have gone their separate ways.

References

Defunct political party alliances in Ukraine